Once Upon a Time in China (released in the Philippines as Enter the New Game of Death) is a 1991 Hong Kong martial arts film written and directed by Tsui Hark, starring Jet Li as Chinese martial arts master and folk hero of Cantonese ethnicity, Wong Fei-hung. It is the first installment in the Once Upon a Time in China film series.

Plot
The film is set in Foshan, China sometime in the late 19th century during the Qing dynasty. Liu Yongfu, the commander of the Black Flag Army, invites Wong Fei-hung on board his ship to watch a lion dance. Sailors on board a nearby French ship hear the sound of firecrackers and mistakenly think that Liu's ship is firing at them so they return fire and injure the dancers. Wong picks up the lion head and finishes the performance. Liu comments about the perilous situation China is in, and then gives Wong a hand fan inscribed with all the unequal treaties signed between China and other countries.

Wong is the martial arts instructor of the local militia in Foshan. He also runs his own traditional Chinese medicine clinic, Po-chi-lam, and has three apprentices: "Porky Wing", "Bucktooth" So, and Kai. He meets Siu-kwan, the daughter of a sworn brother of his grandfather. Even though she is around the same age as him, he still has to address her as "13th Aunt" as she is considered more "senior" than him. They have romantic feelings for each other but their relationship is restrained because it is taboo in the conservative Chinese society of their time.

Leung Foon arrives in Foshan with an opera troupe to stage performances. He encounters 13th Aunt by chance, has a few clumsy encounters with her, and develops a crush on her. He also runs into trouble with the Shaho Gang, which terrorises and extorts money from local businesses. A fight breaks out between the gang and the local militia while Wong is meeting the Governor of Foshan in a restaurant. The gangsters flee when they realise they are no match for Wong. The Governor blames Wong for the disturbance, and disbands and arrests the militia members. Wong confronts the Shaho Gang's leader, defeats him and captures him, but the authorities release him because no one wants to help Wong by testifying as a witness in court.

In the meantime, Leung Foon meets a northern martial artist, "Iron Vest" Yim, and decides to follow him. Yim wants to become famous and start a martial arts school in Foshan, but he needs to prove himself first. One night, the Shaho Gang sets fire to Po-chi-lam in revenge, after which they flee and take shelter under Jackson, an American official. In return for protection from the authorities, the Shaho Gang helps Jackson run his underground human trafficking ring by kidnapping Chinese women to be sent to America as prostitutes. When Wong and the Governor are watching an opera performance, the Shaho Gang and Jackson's men ambush them and try to assassinate the Governor and kill Wong. Their plan fails but many innocent people at the theatre are wounded. The Governor blames Wong and threatens to arrest and execute him, but allows him to give medical attention to the injured.

While tending to the injured people in his clinic, Wong meets an escaped Chinese labourer from America who relates his story of how he and his fellow labourers were treated in America. Just then, Yim arrives at Po-chi-lam and insists on challenging Wong to a fight to prove he is the better fighter. Yim leaves with Leung Foon, who was fired from the opera troupe, after he was defeated by Wong but later joins the Shaho Gang instead – even though Leung strongly objects to Yim working with the gang. Shortly after Yim left, the Governor shows up and orders his men to search Po-chi-lam for fugitives. Wong and his apprentices fight with the Governor's men until 13th Aunt, "Bucktooth" So and the labourer have escaped. Wong then surrenders himself and is imprisoned along with his apprentices. In the meantime, the Shaho Gang kills the labourer, abducts 13th Aunt and takes her to their base. "Bucktooth" So escapes and goes to the prison to inform Wong. The prison guards release Wong and his apprentices out of respect for him.

Wong and his apprentices disguise themselves and infiltrate Jackson's base to find and rescue 13th Aunt. Yim engages Wong in a one-on-one fight and again, Wong defeats Yim for the second time in a row, and realises that he has been cheating in fights; there is a small spearhead tied onto the tip of Yim's queue (which Wong uses to tear Yim's queue in retaliation for cheating) at the same time, Wong's apprentices and Leung Foon overcome the Shaho Gang and Jackson's men, and save 13th Aunt and the kidnapped women. Just as Wong is about to board Jackson's ship, Yim shows up, wanting to resume his fight with Wong, and gets fatally shot by Jackson's men. With his dying breath, he tells Wong that "martial arts stand no chance against guns". During the fight on the ship, the Shaho Gang's leader meets his end after being pushed into a furnace. At the critical moment, Jackson takes the Governor hostage at gunpoint, but Wong kills Jackson by using his fingers to flick an unused bullet into Jackson's forehead, and saves the Governor. At the end of the film, Wong accepts Leung as his fourth apprentice and they take a group photo in Po-chi-lam.

Cast

Release and reception
Once Upon a Time in China was released in Hong Kong on 15 August 1991. The film was a box office hit and is largely credited with starting the period martial arts craze of the early to mid 1990s. It ran for almost two months, the longest duration for any of the series, and grossed HK$29,672,278 in Hong Kong. In the Philippines, the film was released as Enter the New Game of Death by First Films on 15 October 1992.

Critical response
Once Upon a Time in China was given highly favorable reviews from film critics. Rotten Tomatoes reported a score of 88%.

Accolades

References

Sources

External links

 
 

1991 films
1991 martial arts films
1990s biographical films
1990s Cantonese-language films
Films about race and ethnicity
Films directed by Tsui Hark
Films set in Guangdong
Films set in the Qing dynasty
Golden Harvest films
Hong Kong New Wave films
Hong Kong biographical films
Hong Kong martial arts films
Kung fu films
Mixed martial arts films
Once Upon a Time in China (film series)
1990s Hong Kong films